General Las Heras Partido is a small partido in the northeast of Buenos Aires Province in Argentina.

The partido and its main town are named after Juan Gregorio de las Heras, a hero of the Argentine War of Independence and governor of Buenos Aires.

Towns
General Las Heras, Buenos Aires (district capital)
Enrique Flynn
General Hornos
La Choza
Lozano
Plomer
Villars

External links

 
 InfoBAN Las Heras
 IMAGENES de Las Heras y todos sus pueblos

1864 establishments in Argentina
Partidos of Buenos Aires Province